Craig Skinner may refer to:

Craig Skinner (footballer) (born 1970), English footballer
Craig Skinner (volleyball) (born 1969), American volleyball coach